The list of FIBA Basketball World Cup winning head coaches shows all of the head coaches that have won the FIBA Basketball World Cup, which is the main international competition for senior men's basketball national teams, and that is governed by the International Basketball Federation (FIBA).

Key

List

Multiple winners

See also 
 List of FIBA AfroBasket winning head coaches
 List of FIBA AmeriCup winning head coaches
 List of FIBA Asia Cup winning head coaches
 List of FIBA EuroBasket winning head coaches

References

External links
 
 

R